Lee Sang-hun was a South Korean basketball player. He competed in the men's tournament at the 1948 Summer Olympics.

References

External links
 

Year of birth missing
Possibly living people
South Korean men's basketball players
Olympic basketball players of South Korea
Basketball players at the 1948 Summer Olympics
Place of birth missing